Chris Griffin is a main character on the animated series Family Guy.

Chris Griffin may also refer to:

Chris Griffin (politician) (born 1980), North Dakota politician
Chris Griffin (musician) (1915–2005), American jazz trumpeter
J. Chris Griffin, music producer

See also
Chris Griffiths (born 1990), English field hockey player
Kris Griffin (born 1981), American football player